Tryggvi Þórhallsson (9 February 1889 – 31 July 1935) was prime minister of Iceland from 28 August 1927 to 3 June 1932. He served as speaker of the Althing in 1933. He was a member of the Progressive Party.

He was the Minister of Finance of Iceland from 1928 to 1929 and in 1931.

Tryggvi died on 31 July 1935 in a hospital in Reykjavík after battling an illness.

References

External links

1889 births
1935 deaths
Tryggvi Thorhallsson
Finance ministers of Iceland
Speakers of the Althing
Progressive Party (Iceland) politicians